Mosholu Parkway is a hybrid freeway-standard parkway and grade-level roadway in the New York City borough of the Bronx, constructed from 1935 to 1937 as part of the roadway network created under Robert Moses. The New York City Department of Transportation is responsible for the operation and maintenance of the roadway while the New York City Department of Parks and Recreation is responsible for the surrounding rights-of-way. The parkway is designated as New York State Route 908F (NY 908F), an unsigned reference route, by the New York State Department of Transportation.

Route description

Mosholu Parkway begins at exit 8E of the Bronx River Parkway. It heads northward as an arterial boulevard through the northern parts of the Bronx. The highway crosses through Bedford Park, passing Bainbridge Avenue. It intersects with the Grand Concourse afterwards, with Jerome Avenue, Sedgwick Avenue and West Gun Hill Road soon after. Within Van Cortlandt Park, the parkway becomes a limited-access freeway, with exits for the southbound Major Deegan Expressway (Interstate 87) and the Henry Hudson Parkway near its northern terminus at the Westchester County line (where it turns into the Saw Mill River Parkway).

A bikeway, part of the East Coast Greenway, runs along the northeast side of the parkway from Bronx Park to Van Cortlandt Park, connecting through the park to other trails and playing fields and to Broadway.

History

Etymology 
There are conflicting accounts as to what "Mosholu" is derived from. According to one account, "Mosholu" is an Algonquin word meaning "smooth stones" or "small stones", and was first applied to the nearby creek now known as Tibbetts Brook. The southern end of the parkway was once home to another creek called Schuil Brook, running under what is now Middlebrook Road, which supplied water to a British fort located on old Van Cortlandt Avenue East during the American Revolutionary War.

According to another etymology, Mosholu is a contraction of the name of the Choctaw chief Mushulatubbee.  The Choctaw were not local to New York, but Mushulatubbee was well known for his assistance to the US during the War of 1812.  A variant form of the contracted name was given to two ships; the USS Mashula (launched as USS Severn in 1867) and the SS Moshulu.  The latter ship was apparently named with the understanding that it was a Seneca word meaning fearless.

Context 
In the 1870s, landscape architect Frederick Law Olmsted envisioned a greenbelt across the Bronx, consisting of parks and parkways that would align with existing geography. However, in 1877, the city declined to act upon his plan. Around the same time, New York Herald editor John Mullaly pushed for the creation of parks in New York City, particularly lauding the Van Cortlandt and Pell families' properties in the western and eastern Bronx respectively. He formed the New York Park Association in November 1881. There were objections to the system, which would apparently be too far from Manhattan, in addition to precluding development on the parks' sites. However, newspapers and prominent lobbyists, who supported such a park system, were able to petition the bill into the New York State Senate, and later, the New York State Assembly (the legislature's lower house).

In June 1884, Governor Grover Cleveland signed the New Parks Act into law, authorizing the creation of the park system. The system consisted of three parkways and six parks, with Bronx Park at the center of the system. Bronx Park was connected to Van Cortlandt Park in the northwest via Mosholu Parkway; to Pelham Bay Park in the east via Pelham Parkway; and to Crotona Park in the south via Crotona Parkway. There were no direct connections to Claremont Park and St. Mary's Park, the other two parks in the system.

Reconstruction 
The road was reconstructed between 1935 and 1937, including widening the entire parkway, making the section from the Saw Mill to Gun Hill Road, replacing the intersection at Jerome Avenue with an overpass, and installing a wide median between Marion Avenue and the Grand Concourse.

Transportation
The Bx28 runs on Mosholu Parkway between Paul Avenue and Bainbridge Avenue. The Bx1, Bx2, Bx10, Bx26, Bx38 runs to/from Fordham and the BxM4 have short segments on Jerome Avenue.

The IRT Jerome Avenue Line has the Mosholu Parkway station at Mosholu Parkway and Jerome Avenue.

Exit list

See also
 
 
 
 Bedford Park, the neighborhood on the southern side of Mosholu Parkway
 Norwood, the neighborhood on the northern side of Mosholu Parkway
 Bronx Park, the neighborhood and park at the eastern end of Mosholu Parkway
 Van Cortlandt Park, the park at the western end of Mosholu Parkway

References

External links

 Mosholu Parkway page at nycroads.com

Parkways in New York City
Robert Moses projects
Streets in the Bronx
Transportation in the Bronx
Parks in the Bronx